Freddy or Freddie Rodriguez may refer to:

 Freddy Rodriguez (actor) (born 1975), American actor
 Freddy Rodríguez (artist) (born 1945), Dominican Republic artist in the United States
 Freddy Rodríguez (baseball) (1924–2009), former Major League Baseball pitcher
 Fred Rodriguez (born 1973), nicknamed "Freddie", American road racing cyclist
 Freddie Rodriguez, American politician who assumed office in 2013

See also
 Fernando Rodríguez (disambiguation)